George Richard Lunn (June 23, 1873 – November 27, 1948) was an American clergyman and politician from New York.  He was the first Socialist mayor in the state of New York, a U.S. Representative from 1917 to 1919, and Lieutenant Governor from 1923 to 1924.

Biography

Early years
George R. Lunn was born June 23, 1873 on a farm located near the small town of Lenox, Taylor County, Iowa. His parents, Martin Adolphus Lunn and the former Martha Bratton, reared 6 surviving children, four boys and two girls, with three others dying in infancy.

The son and grandson of farmers, Lunn was raised in a conservative religious household which strictly observed the Sabbath and regarded the playing of musical instruments in church to be an unacceptable nod to secularity. The family relocated to the city of Des Moines when George was just a boy, and he quit school at the age of 12 to work there as a paperboy.

At the age of 17 Lunn left home and briefly relocated to Council Bluffs, Iowa. He then made his way further west to Omaha, Nebraska, where he worked as the driver of a delivery wagon. As a teenager, Lunn decided to enter the Christian ministry and he began three years of preparatory educational work to make up the high school education that he lacked.

He was accepted to Bellevue College in Bellevue, Nebraska, enrolling in the fall of 1892 and graduating in 1897. In 1893 the 20-year old Lunn was approached by the congregation of a small church in La Platte, Nebraska, located five miles south of Bellevue, and was asked to become their pastor. Although he had never preached before, church parishioners were not aware of this fact and Lunn accepted the position. He would retain the position for several years, paid out of the church's weekly collections.

Lunn was anxious to attend the Princeton Theological Seminary and in the fall of 1897 he enrolled there. However, near the end of his first year at Princeton the Spanish–American War erupted. He returned home to Omaha to take over a Presbyterian pastorate for the summer, where he was convinced to take a position offered him as a chaplain in the United States Army, holding the rank of Corporal as part of the Company A of the Third Nebraska Regiment. He spent the duration of the brief war stationed in Jacksonville, Florida.

Following his release from the military, Lunn enrolled at Union Theological Seminary—an institution which he felt was less conservative and constraining than was the Princeton Seminary. He would graduate from Union Theological Seminary in 1901, finally gaining ordination as a Presbyterian minister.

Lunn married in May 1901 and upon graduation was called to be the associate pastor of the Lafayette Avenue Presbyterian Church in Brooklyn, New York. He would remain there until 1904, at which time he was named the pastor of the First Dutch Reformed Church of Schenectady, New York—the city with which he would become intimately associated.

Political career
Closely concerned with matters of ethics and poverty, Lunn became a Christian socialist, testifying the social gospel from the pulpit. Seeking to eliminate suffering through structural change, Lunn joined the Socialist Party of America and in 1911 he was elected Mayor of Schenectady at the head of the local Socialist ticket. His term was marked by a commitment to expansion of the city's parks and playgrounds, establishment of city health centers, and improvements in the local system of public schools and in garbage collections—the classic range of practical programmatic interests later known as sewer socialism.

During his first term of office, Lunn was invited to speak in support of a strike then in progress in the town of Little Falls, New York. He accepted the offer but was denied permission to speak by city officials in a public park. Lunn nevertheless attempted to speak, reading from Abraham Lincoln's Gettysburg Address and wound up as one of four people arrested on charges of "inciting to riot"—charges later dropped when the tension of the situation lessened.

Lunn's first term ran from 1911 to 1913 and he was returned to office for a second two-year term in 1915, again on the ticket of the Socialist Party. During his second term of office, Lunn was approached by officials of the Democratic Party and invited to switch parties for a run for United States Congress.

He was elected as a Democrat to the 65th United States Congress, and served from March 4, 1917, to March 3, 1919. In 1920, he was defeated by Harry C. Walker in the Democratic primary for U.S. Senator from New York.

From 1919 to 1923 he served again as Schenectady's Mayor. He was a Delegate to the Democratic National Conventions in 1920, 1924, 1928, 1932, and 1936.

Lunn was Lieutenant Governor of New York from 1923 to 1924, elected on the Democratic ticket in 1922, but defeated for re-election in 1924, even as Democratic Governor Alfred E. Smith was winning reelection. The 1924 election was the last in which the Governor and Lieutenant Governor were elected on different tickets.

In 1925, Lunn was appointed to the New York Public Service Commission, and he served until 1942.

He served as Commander-in-Chief of the United Spanish War Veterans from 1931 to 1932.

Death and burial
Lunn retired to Del Mar, California, where he died on November 27, 1948.  He was buried at Forest Lawn Memorial Park in Glendale, California.
Together with his first wife, the former Mabel Healy of Brooklyn, Lunn raised a total of 5 children. Made a widower in 1931, Lunn remarried in 1932, wedding Anita Oliver Jensen of California.

Footnotes

Works

 "Testimony to the Special Investigative Committee of the New York State Assembly, Jan. 28, 1920." Corvallis, OR: 1000 Flowers Publishing, 2012.

See also
List of elected socialist mayors in the United States

Further reading

 George R. Lunn Gardner, The Schenectadians: The Story of Schenectady's 20th Century and Two Men Who Helped Shape It. Writer's Club Press, 2001.
 Gurnett, Kate. 'The rise of socialism in Schenectady. Albany Times Union. Monday, June 12, 2006.
 Kenneth E. Hendrickson Jr., Tribune of the People: George R. Lunn and the Rise and Fall of Christian Socialism in Schenectady, in Bruce M. Stave (ed.), Socialism and the Cities,  Port Washington: Kennikat Press. 1975.
 Kenneth E. Hendrickson Jr., "George R. Lunn and the Socialist Era in Schenectady, New York, 1909-1916," New York History, vol. 47, no. 1 (January 1966), pp. 22–40. In JSTOR
 George R. Lunn: A Memorial. Rancho Santa Fe, CA: n.p., 1949.

External links
 George Richard Lunn at Find A Grave

1873 births
1948 deaths
People from Lenox, Iowa
People from Del Mar, California
Bellevue University alumni
Union Theological Seminary (New York City) alumni
American military personnel of the Spanish–American War
Military personnel from Nebraska
American clergy
American socialists
American Christian socialists
Socialist Party of America politicians from New York (state)
Lieutenant Governors of New York (state)
Mayors of Schenectady, New York
Burials at Forest Lawn Memorial Park (Glendale)
Democratic Party members of the United States House of Representatives from New York (state)
Presbyterian socialists